Ningbo Huaao Football Club (Simplified Chinese: 宁波华奥足球俱乐部) is a Chinese football club based in Ningbo, Zhejiang who play in the Ningbo Fubang Stadium in the Chinese Football Association Yi League. Starting in 2006 the club entered at the bottom of the Chinese football league pyramid where in their debt season they would qualify for the play-offs, yet were knocked out in the quarter-finals. In their attempt to win promotion they would merge with fellow third team football club Suzhou Trips in 2010.

History

All-Time League rankings

:  in group stage

Current squad

See also
Suzhou Trips

References

External links
 Team profile at Official FA website

Defunct football clubs in China
Football clubs in China
2006 establishments in China
Association football clubs established in 2006